The National Homelessness Advice Service  (NHAS) is an advice, training and support service in the United Kingdom. It advises on housing and homelessness and is used by local authorities, local citizen's advice and other agencies who give advice to the public on housing/homelessness to seek advice on queries. The NHAS is funded by the Ministry of Housing, Communities and Local Government and provided by Shelter.

See also
Homelessness in the United Kingdom

References

External links
National Homelessness Advice Service

Homelessness in England
Advice organizations